Michael Schlow (born c. 1964, Brooklyn) is a Boston based chef and restaurateur.  His restaurants include Via Matta, Radius, and Tico (there are also six Washington, DC area restaurants).  Both Via Matta and Radius were opened with Boston restaurateur Christopher Myers.  He was a Master Contestant on Season One, Episode One of Top Chef Masters (season 1).

Schlow was born in Brooklyn and grew up in Somerville, New Jersey. He graduated from high school there.

Career
Schlow gave up a baseball scholarship to attend the Academy of Culinary Arts at Atlantic Cape Community College in New Jersey. He began his career in New York City and then Long Island before moving to Boston in 1995 to cook at Café Louis.

Bibliography
IT'S ABOUT TIME (cookbook)

Awards and honors 
James Beard Foundation Award, Best Chef, Northeast 2000
Radius was named “Best New Restaurant” by Food & Wine, “Best Restaurant” and “Best Power Lunch” by Boston Magazine and one of the “25 Best American Restaurants” by Gourmet Magazine.
Via Matta was named one of “America’s Best Restaurants” (also by Gourmet Magazine and Esquire called it one of the “Best New Restaurants in America.”
Great Bay opened in 2003 and that same year was voted “Best Seafood Restaurant in Boston” by Boston Magazine.  He was Executive Chef and co-owner.

References

Chefs from Massachusetts
American male chefs
American restaurateurs
Atlantic Cape Community College alumni
People from Brooklyn
People from Somerville, New Jersey
1960s births
Living people
James Beard Foundation Award winners
Reality cooking competition contestants
American cookbook writers